Operation Amalgam Virgo is a CINCNORAD joint task counter-terrorist and field training exercise (FTX) carried out in Tyndall Air Force Base, Florida on early June 2001. NORAD sponsored the multi-agency planning exercise involving the hypothetical scenario of a cruise missile or UAV launched by a terrorist group. Key military players involved in the exercise also included personnel from the 1st Air Force battalion, the U.S. National Guard, the U.S. Reserve forces, and the U.S. Navy.

Several naval ships including the USS Yorktown and the Navy Aegis cruiser were dispatched to the Gulf of Mexico as part of the multi-service anti-cruise missile operation. Military land personnel from the 1st Air Force also engaged in gathering radar information on low-level targets by using the Joint-Based Expeditionary Connectivity Center (JBECC), a mobile shelter capable of being deployed to high-risk regions while providing early warning signals on cruise missile attacks.

References

External links
 http://www.globalsecurity.org/military/ops/amalgam-virgo.htm – Overview | Operation Amalgam Virgo
 http://www.ratical.org/ratville/CAH/linkscopy/AmalgumVirgo.pdf – SEADS concept proposal for Amalgam Virgo, June 2001 | PDF

Government databases in the United States
21st-century military history of the United States
North American Aerospace Defense Command
Counterterrorism
2001 in Florida